Jens Fiedler is an East German sprint canoer who competed in the late 1980s. He won two medals at the 1986 ICF Canoe Sprint World Championships in Montreal with a gold in the K-4 500m and silver in the K-4 1000m events.

References

German male canoeists
Living people
Year of birth missing (living people)
ICF Canoe Sprint World Championships medalists in kayak